Chokila Iyer is an Indian diplomat and civil servant who served as India's first female foreign secretary from March 2001 to June 2002. She is an Indian Foreign Service officer of the 1964 batch and served as the Ambassador of India to the Republic of Ireland.

Post-diplomatic career

National Commission for Scheduled Areas and Scheduled Tribes
Iyer, after retiring from Foreign Secretary post, worked as vice chairperson of National Commission for Scheduled Areas and Scheduled Tribes. Former Chief Justice of India J.S. Verma was heading the commission, which had started functioning in October 2008.

New Broadcasting Standards Authority
On February 19, 2009 Iyer was appointed as the member of the New Broadcasting Standards Authority. The authority was commissioned to implement a code of ethics and broadcasting standards for broadcasts by news channels in the country. She was given the membership, under the "eminent persons" category. to  set up to enforce the code of ethics and broadcasting standards for news channels.

References 

Year of birth missing (living people)
Living people
Indian government officials
Indian civil servants
Indian Foreign Secretaries
People from Darjeeling
University of North Bengal alumni